Hong U-won or Hong Woo-won (29 July 1605 – 27 July 1687) was a Korean Neo-Confucian scholar, politician and writer, who lived during the Joseon Dynasty. He was part of the Namyang Hong clan.

Arts

Books
Nampamunjib (남파문집) [Vol. 13]
Baekheuknan (백흑난)
Mokgeunchimseol (목근침설) [essay]

Works
Yisanguisindobimyeong (이상의신도비명, 李尙毅神道碑銘)
Yunseondosindobimyeong (윤선도신도비명)
Yuseondosijang (윤선도 시장, 諡狀)
Jeongmyojunggannamyanghongssiseboseo (정묘중간남양홍씨세보서, 丁卯重刊南陽洪氏世譜序)

See also
Song Si-yeol
Yun Seon-do

External links 
 Hong Uwon:Nate .
 Hong Uwon .
 Hong Uwon .
Hong Uwon on Encykorea .

1605 births
1687 deaths
17th-century Korean poets
Korean politicians
Korean scholars
Korean Confucianists
17th-century Korean philosophers
Neo-Confucian scholars